The Dreamer/The Believer is the ninth studio album by American rapper Common. It was released in the UK on December 19, 2011 and in the US on December 20 through Warner Bros. Records alongside Common's newly launched Think Common Music Inc. Common's longtime friend and frequent collaborator No I.D. handled the album's production entirely himself.

Background
Recording sessions for the album began in 2009, and was originally due for a spring release, but was not completed because Common wanted to concentrate on acting.  The album was scheduled for an April 2011 release, but was pushed back to late 2011.  The first single was "Ghetto Dreams" featuring Nas. The music video was directed by Matt Alonzo and executive produced by Leah Harmony. It was released on iTunes July 6, 2011.  In preparation for the album's release, Common spoke with The BoomBox about how the LP was taking shape and that he and No I.D. were crafting the album in a more positive direction: "It's going to be positive hip-hop.  Hip-hop that can really generate good spirit, the spirit of the music and just good energy.  I'm excited about the album 'The Dreamer, The Believer'.  I feel blessed that I got to work with No I.D.  I'm enthused to do hip-hop, which is something that I have to do when I feel it.  It's the spirit and energy of hip-hop that made you just enjoy it and love the music and not feel like, 'Man, is this gonna sell?' or 'I sold this many.'  It's stuff that made you feel something, it's stuff that you can use that inspired your life.  I think about hip-hop like Brand Nubian and KRS-One and N.W.A and Rakim, that stuff inspired my life.  Those things really shaped who I am."  The Target Exclusive Edition comes with two additional tracks.

The second single off the album was "Blue Sky" which was officially made available on iTunes October 7, 2011. The song samples "Mr. Blue Sky" by Electric Light Orchestra.

Controversies

After releasing the single "Sweet," the blog-sphere was ablaze with speculation regarding the song's possible target.  Many hip hop blogs guessed the song might be about rapper Drake, as he often interjects singing into his raps and "Sweet" makes critical jabs at singing rappers.  Common insisted "Sweet" was about anyone who feels it and not specifically written for any person, but at a concert in L.A., Drake fired shots widely seen as directed towards Common, and on January 6, 2012, Drake once again responded on a track called "Stay Schemin'" from Rick Ross' new mixtape Rich Forever. This resulted in Common remixing the same track with his own verse and the lines "I’m taking too long with this amateur guy, You ain’t wet nobody, n****, you Canada Dry".<ref>{{cite web|title=Common Calls Drake 'Canada Dry' On 'Stay Schemin Remix|url=http://rapfix.mtv.com/2012/01/09/common-calls-drake-canada-dry-on-stay-schemin-remix/|access-date=10 January 2012}}</ref> The feud has since settled down with the two eventually coming face to face at the Grammys, on February 12, 2012. Not long after the Grammys, the two were photographed together after Drake greeted Common at the NBA All-Star game.

Reception

Critical responseThe Dreamer/The Believer received generally positive reviews from music critics. At Metacritic, which assigns a weighted mean rating out of 100 to reviews from mainstream critics, the album received an average score of 74, based on 26 reviews, which indicates "generally favorable reviews".The Independent gave the album all five stars and said of Common, "That he manages to express such ethical and religious principles without coming across like a sanctimonious buzz-killer is quite remarkable." In his Consumer Guide, Robert Christgau gave it a three-star honorable mention while picking out two songs from the album ("Raw [How You Like It]" and "The Believer"), and quipped about Common, "Still on a major label, he's damn well gonna act it."

Even more positive results came in.  DJ Booth gave it a score of four-and-a-half spins out of five and quipped, "Together the two vets have created a work that's worthy of some serious recognition."  HipHopDX also gave it a score of four-and-a-half out of five and said that every song "succeeds off the strength of Common and No I.D.'s seasoned chemistry." RapReviews gave it a score of 8.5 out of 10 and stated, "This isn't an album of 1990's styles brought to 2012 - these are contemporary beats and rhymes that can hang with anything else coming out on the scene." Consequence of Sound gave it a score of three-and-a-half stars out of five and said it "doesn't really spark until you fold in a few of the harder tracks." BBC Music gave it a favorable review and said that Common "merges his raw lyrical roots with No I.D.'s voluminous soundtrack, resulting in a decent album far more celebratory than his previous work." Los Angeles Times gave it a score of two-and-a-half stars out of four and said that Common "continues to impress and regress."

Other reviews are average or mixed.  Canadian magazine Now gave it a score of three out of five and said about Common, "Compared to his earlier work, it's just decent." The A.V. Club gave it a C and called it "a passable album of mostly neutral jams and bare-minimum production." Sputnikmusic gave it a score of two-and-a-half out of five and said it "shows him with his head in the clouds and addressing the same tired crowd with the same speech he's been writing for years."

Commercial performance
The album debuted at number eighteen on the US Billboard 200 chart, with 69,000 copies sold in its first week in the United States. As of July 2014, the album has sold 154,000 copies in the United States.

Track listing
 All songs produced by No I.D.

Additional vocals by: Makeba Riddick (3, 7), James Fauntleroy II (1, 3, 5, 8, 9, 10), Hannah Sidibe (7, 9)
Sample credits
"The Dreamer" contains a sample from "Rashida" by Jon Lucien
"Ghetto Dreams" contains samples from "Let's Make It Last" by The Fellows and "Hope" by Nas
"Blue Sky" contains a sample from "Mr. Blue Sky" by Electric Light Orchestra
"Sweet" contains samples from "You Don't Have to Worry" by Doris & Kelley, "Action" by Orange Krush and "Remix for P Is Free" by Boogie Down Productions
"Gold" contains samples from "The Jam" by Graham Central Station, "Stud-Spider" by Tony Joe White and "To Be True" by Harold Melvin & The Blue Notes
"Lovin' I Lost" contains a sample from "I Loved And I Lost" by Curtis Mayfield
"Celebrate" contains samples from "Celebrate Me Home" by Kenny Loggins and "I Got Some" by Sugar Billy Garner
"Raw (How You Like It)" contains a sample from "Memory of Pain" by The Aynsley Dunbar Retaliation
"Windows" contains a sample from "Candy Maker" by Tommy James & The Shondells, "Asleep in The Desert" by ZZ Top and "Tune" by Sam Spence

Personnel
Credits for The Dreamer/The Believer adapted from Allmusic.

Jason Agel – Engineer
Maya Angelou – Composer, Poetry
D. Burton – Composer
Mike Chavez – A&R, Executive Producer
George Clinton – Composer
Common – Executive Producer
Blake Douglas – Assistant Engineer
Derek Dudley – Executive Producer, Management
James Fauntleroy – Composer
James Fauntleroy II – Vocals
Kaye Fox – Vocals
Kenny Gamble – Composer
Larry Graham – Composer
Eddie Hazel – Composer
Derrick Hodge – Bass
Leon Huff – Composer
Bob James – Composer
Rob Kinelski – Engineer, Mixing
David Kutch – Mastering
John Legend – Vocals
Cara Lewis – Booking
Sam Lewis – Assistant Engineer, Vocals
Kenny Loggins – Composer
Omar Loya – Assistant Engineer, Engineer
Lonnie Lynn – Composer, Poetry
Jeff Lynne – Composer
Curtis Mayfield – Composer
Percy Mayfield – Composer
Matt Morris – Vocals
Laurence Naber – Mixing Assistant
No I.D. – Executive Producer, Producer
Omoye – Vocals
James Poyser – Keyboards
Kevin Randolph – Keyboards
Makeba Riddick – Composer, Vocals
Hannah Sidibe – Composer, Vocals
Chris Time Steele – Vocal Engineer
J. Stephens – Composer
Todd Sullivan – Sample Clearance
Steven Taylor – Photography
The Twilight Tone – Scratching
Anna Ugarte – Assistant Engineer, Mixing Assistant
Steve Wyreman – Bass, Composer, Guitar, Wurlitzer
Danny Zook – Sample Clearance

Charts

Weekly charts

Year-end charts

References

External links
 The Dreamer/The Believer at Discogs
 The Dreamer/The Believer'' at Metacritic

2011 albums
Albums produced by No I.D.
Common (rapper) albums
Warner Records albums